Dmitry V. Sklyarov (born 1983) is a Finnish chess player. He was awarded the title of International Master in 2012.

Chess career
He qualified for the Chess World Cup 2021, where he was defeated by Vasif Durarbayli 1.5-0.5 in the first round.

References

External links

Dmitry V. Sklyarov at 365Chess.com

1983 births
Living people
Finnish chess players
Chess International Masters